The discography of Elizabeth Gillies, an American actress and singer, consists of one extended play, one single, 25 promotional singles, and three music videos.

Extended plays

Singles

Promotional singles

Other charted songs

Other appearances

Music videos

References

Gillies, Elizabeth